Ormiston is a surname of Scottish origin. Notable people with the surname include:
Callum Ormiston, South African cyclist
Graeme Ormiston, Scottish rugby union referee
Irving Ormiston (1895–1969), Australian rugby union player
James Ormiston (1915–1977), Canadian politician
John Ormiston (1880–1917), Scottish footballer
Ross Ormiston (born 1955), New Zealand cricketer
Susan Ormiston (born c. 1959), Canadian journalist
Thomas Ormiston (1878–1937), Scottish parliamentarian

Scottish surnames